Kharar is a town and a municipal council in Mohali district in the state of Punjab, India. It is nearby Mohali city. The area of Kharar is part of the "Greater Mohali" region.

Demographics

Close to 60% of the people in Kharar are Sikhs making it the second Sikh majority town in the Greater Mohali region after Mohali.

Kharar is a block situated in the Sahibzada Ajit Singh Nagar district in Punjab. Positioned in the urban region of Punjab, it is among the 4 blocks of Sahibzada Ajit Singh Nagar district. As per the government records, the block code of Kharar is 129. This block has 150 villages, and there are a total of 44,620 families.

Education
There are many educational institutions established from British Raj till post independence in Kharar.
Christian boys high school, Kharar established in 1891 and the school was headed by principal RW Ryburn .
Khalsa senior secondary school, Kharar was established in 1920
Arya senior secondary school and women college, Kharar was established in 1968 by Arya pratinidi sabha, Jalandhar.
Henderson Jubilee senior secondary school, Kharar was established in 1975.
IPS senior secondary school, Badala Road Kharar
Vickram public high school kharar
Lawerance public senior secondary school, sector-51 

Kharar also have many universities, engineering colleges and a dental college in its vicinity, such as: 
 Rayat Bahra University, Sahauran
 Chandigarh University, Gharuan
 Chandigarh Group of Colleges, Landran and Jhanjheri
 Doaba Group of Colleges, Sahauran
 Guru Gobind Singh College of Modern Technology, Khanpur
 Shaheed Udham Singh College of Engineering & Technology, Tangori
 Government Polytechnic College, Khunimajra

Medical testing
Kharar has Punjab's only State Chemical Testing Laboratory which can perform viscera examination and a Forensic Laboratory, helpful for speedy justice in legal cases.
Kharar has its own government hospital as well. It is situated in the north end of the city.

Commerce
Virtuous Retail Punjab Mall (VR Punjab Mall) (formerly known as North Country Mall) in Kharar is one of the largest shopping malls with an area of 2 million sq ft.

See also
Greater Mohali
New Chandigarh

References

Cities and towns in Sahibzada Ajit Singh Nagar district